The Venezuela women's national rugby sevens team is Venezuela's representative team in rugby sevens for women. They competed at the 2015 CONSUR Women's Sevens, they placed third and qualified for the Olympic Repechage Tournament in Dublin. They also competed in the South American Women's Rugby Sevens Championship in Brazil in 2016.

Tournament record

South American Women's Sevens 

 2004 - 2nd
 2005 - 3rd
 2007 - 3rd
 2008 - 3rd
 2009 - 3rd
 2010 - 6th
 2011 - 7th
 2012 - 6th
 2013 - 4th
 2014 - 7th
 2015 - 3rd
 2016 - 4th

Pan American Games 
 2015: Did not qualify

Bolivarian Games 
 2013: 2nd

Central American and Caribbean Games 
 2014: 2nd

Current squad  
Squad to the 2016 South American Women's Sevens:

See also
 Rugby union in Venezuela
 Venezuela national rugby union team
 Venezuela national rugby sevens team

References

Rugby union in Venezuela
Women's national rugby sevens teams
R